Vladimir Konyakhin (born 5 August 1943) is a Soviet former sports shooter. He competed in the 50 metre rifle three positions event at the 1968 Summer Olympics.

References

1943 births
Living people
Soviet male sport shooters
Olympic shooters of the Soviet Union
Shooters at the 1968 Summer Olympics
Sportspeople from Krasnoyarsk